Alfonso Merchante de Valeria (1513–1581) was a Roman Catholic prelate who served as Auxiliary Bishop of Burgos (1563–1581) and Titular Bishop of Sidon (1563–1581).

Biography
On 15 October 1563, Alfonso Merchante de Valeria was appointed during the papacy of Pope Pius IV as Auxiliary Bishop of Burgos and Titular Bishop of Sidon. In 1563, he was consecrated bishop by Francisco Mendoza Bobadilla, Bishop of Burgos. He served as Auxiliary Bishop of Burgos until his death in 1581. While bishop, he was the principal co-consecrator of Sebastián Lartaún, Bishop of Cuzco (1571); Antonio Manrique Valencia, Bishop of Pamplona (1575); Gaspar Juan de la Figuera, Bishop of Jaca (1578); Miguel Rubio, Bishop of Ampurias e Civita (1579); and Miguel Espinosa, Auxiliary Bishop of Valencia (1580)

References

External links and additional sources
 (for Chronology of Bishops) 
 (for Chronology of Bishops) 

16th-century Roman Catholic bishops in Spain
Bishops appointed by Pope Pius IV
1513 births
1581 deaths